K. Raghavan (2 December 1913 – 19 October 2013), also fondly called Raghavan Master, was a Malayalam music composer and Carnatic Vocalist. Along with G. Devarajan, V. Dakshinamoorthy and Baburaj, Raghavan is often credited for the renaissance of Malayalam film music. He is regarded as the pioneer in contributing Malayalam film songs with its own tunes and styles. Till then, Malayalam film songs were in the tunes of popular Hindi and Tamil film songs and old classical kritis. Raghavan gave a new direction and identity to Malayalam film music. He composed around 400 songs in Malayalam cinema and was active in the Malayalam film industry for nearly four decades. In 1997, he was honoured with the J. C. Daniel Award, Kerala government's highest honour for contributions to Malayalam cinema.

Personal life 
Raghavan was born to folk singer M Krishnan and Narayani in Tellicherry in North Malabar on 2 December 1913. He was married to (late) Yashoda and had five children, including three daughters and two sons. He died at the age of 99 on 19 October 2013 in Tellicherry.

Early life
Raghavan was born in Tellicherry near Kannur in the erstwhile Madras Presidency (present-day Kerala) to M. Krishnan and Narayani in 1913. He started studying classical music from his childhood and was also a good football player. His professional career was started as a tambura player in All India Radio, Madras. In 1950 he got transferred to Calicut and there he got involved with film artists.

Career
Raghavan set a new trend in Malayalam film music with the release of the 1954 movie Neelakuyil. Renowned lyricist and Raghavan's 
friend P. Bhaskaran had penned the songs in Neelakkuyil. Raghavan himself has rendered his voice for one of the songs in Neelakkuyil. The song
Kayalarikathu valayerinjappol went on to become an instant hit.

Music career
In a career spanning over four decades, he has scored music for more than sixty Malayalam films and many of his compositions remain ever green classics in Malayalam. Raghavan infused the folk element into Malayalam film music and his rustic melodies replaced the then prevailing trend of imitations of popular Hindi tunes of the day. He also composed songs for plays like Kerala People's Arts Club and All India Radio. Most of his songs were written by P. Bhaskaran. And he dared try out a variety of voices to Malayalam film music, many of them were new. K. J. Yesudas, P. Jayachandran, P.Susheela,Mehboob, K. P. Brahmanandan, M. Balamuralikrishna, M. L. Vasanthakumari, A. P. Komala, Gayathri Srikrishnan, Santha P. Nair, A. M. Rajah, K. P. Udayabhanu, M.G. Radhakrishnan, P. B. Sreenivas, Vani Jayaram, Jikki, V. T. Murali, M. G. Sreekumar, K. S. Chithra and Sujatha Mohan - they have all sung for him.

As a musician
First Movie	Pullimaan in (1951).
Number of Movies	65
Number of Songs	405
State Awards	2

Songs

 Kayalarikathu... 
 Ellarum chollanu... 
 Nazhiyuripalu kondu...
 Hrudaythin romancham... 
 Ekantha Kaamuka Ninte Manoratham ... 
 Shyamasundara pushpame... 
 Aattinakkareyakkare... 
 Poornendumukhiyodambalathil...
 Nalikerathinte nattilenikkoru... 
 Manjani poonilavil... 
 Kathu sookshichoru... 
 Appozhe paranjille... 
 Manathe Mazhamukil malakale...  
 Anuragakkalariyil angathinu vannavale...  
 Pambukalkku maalamundu...  (KPAC drama song)
 Thalayku meethe...  (KPAC drama song)

Awards
Civilian Awards by Govt. of India
 2010 – Padma Shri

Kerala State Film Awards
 1973 – Best Music Director for Nirmalyam
 1977 – Best Music Director – Poojakedukkatha Pookkal.
 1997 – J. C. Daniel Award from the Government of Kerala

Other Awards
 1981 – Kerala Sangeetha Nataka Akademi Fellowship
 2000 – Best Lifetime Achievement Award
 2006 – Swaralaya Yesudas Award
 2011 – M. G. Radhakrishnan Award

References

External links

Complete Listing of K Raghavan's Movie Songs
 
Raghavan the folk master

Malayalam film score composers
Kerala State Film Award winners
People from Thalassery
Recipients of the Padma Shri in arts
1913 births
2013 deaths
20th-century Indian composers
Film musicians from Kerala
21st-century Indian composers
Indian male film score composers
20th-century Indian male singers
20th-century Indian singers
21st-century Indian male singers
21st-century Indian singers
Male Carnatic singers
Carnatic singers
J. C. Daniel Award winners
Recipients of the Kerala Sangeetha Nataka Akademi Fellowship